Labbarthi is a village in Rajavommangi Mandal, Alluri Sitharama Raju district in the state of Andhra Pradesh in India.

Geography 
Labbarthi is located at

Demographics 
 India census, Labbarthi had a population of 1780, out of which 855 were male and 895 were female. The population of children below 6 years of age was 11%. The literacy rate of the village was 55%.

References 

Villages in Rajavommangi mandal